An orbital node is either of the two points where an orbit intersects a plane of reference to which it is inclined. A non-inclined orbit, which is contained in the reference plane, has no nodes.

Planes of reference
Common planes of reference include the following:
 For a geocentric orbit, Earth's equatorial plane. In this case, non-inclined orbits are called equatorial.
 For a heliocentric orbit, the ecliptic or invariable plane. In this case, non-inclined orbits are called ecliptic.
 For an orbit outside the Solar System, the plane through the primary perpendicular to a line through the observer and the primary (called the plane of the sky).

Node distinction 

If a reference direction from one side of the plane of reference to the other is defined, the two nodes can be distinguished. For geocentric and heliocentric orbits, the ascending node (or north node) is where the orbiting object moves north through the plane of reference, and the descending node (or south node) is where it moves south through the plane. In the case of objects outside the Solar System, the ascending node is the node where the orbiting secondary passes away from the observer, and the descending node is the node where it moves towards the observer., p. 137.

The position of the node may be used as one of a set of parameters, called orbital elements, which describe the orbit. This is done by specifying the longitude of the ascending node (or, sometimes, the longitude of the node.)

The line of nodes is the intersection of the object's orbital plane with the plane of reference. It passes through the two nodes.

Symbols and nomenclature 

In medieval and early modern times the ascending and descending nodes were called the "dragon's head" and "dragon's tail", respectively. These terms originally referred to the times when the Moon crossed the apparent path of the sun in the sky. Also, corruptions of the Arabic term such as ganzaar, genzahar, geuzaar and zeuzahar were used in the medieval West to denote either of the nodes. 

Lunar nodes

For the orbit of the Moon around Earth, the  plane is taken to be the ecliptic, not the equatorial plane. The gravitational pull of the Sun upon the Moon causes its nodes to gradually precess westward, completing a cycle in approximately 18.6 years.

See also
 Eclipse
 Euler angles
 Longitude of the ascending node

References 

Technical factors of astrology
Orbits